Violet Town Football Club is an Australian football club which was established in 1880 and has won 14 premierships in various Australian rules football leagues. The club amalgamated with the Violet Town netball club to become the Violet Town Football and Netball Club Inc.

Leagues
The club is currently part of the Kyabram District Football and Netball League (KDFNL) and has two football teams:
Seniors,
Reserves

The seniors are currently coached by Joel Price; the 2006 season was their first in the KDFNL. The senior team was a grand finalist in 2017.
1950 to 1966: Benalla Tungamah Football League
1967 to 1977: Tungamah Football League
1978 to 2005: Benalla & District Football League
2006 to present day: Kyabram District Football League

Location
Violet Town is located in North Eastern Victoria, Australia; the town is found on the route between Melbourne and Albury and is approximately 180 km north-north-east of Melbourne and is between Euroa and Benalla and is bypassed by the Hume Freeway (and former Hume Highway) which are found to the south.

Football Premierships
Seniors
North Eastern Football Association
1923 
Euroa District Football League
1927, 1928
Tatong & Thoona Football Association
1938, 1939
Euroa District Football League
1944, 1948, 1949
Benalla Tungamah Football League
1960, 1961
Benalla & District Football League
1982, 1987, 1990, 2012 

Reserves
 ?

U/18 Premierships
2007 (Kyabram & District Football League)

External links
Official Kyabram and District Football League Website

Kyabram & District Football League clubs
1880 establishments in Australia
Australian rules football clubs established in 1880